A glutamyl-tRNA reductase is an enzyme that catalyzes the chemical reaction

L-glutamate 1-semialdehyde + NADP+ + tRNAGlu  L-glutamyl-tRNAGlu + NADPH + H+

The 3 substrates of this enzyme are L-glutamate 1-semialdehyde, NADP+, and tRNA(Glu), whereas its 3 products are L-glutamyl-tRNA(Glu), NADPH, and H+.

This enzyme belongs to the family of oxidoreductases, to be specific, those acting on the aldehyde or oxo group of donor with NAD+ or NADP+ as acceptor.  The systematic name of this enzyme class is L-glutamate-semialdehyde: NADP+ oxidoreductase (L-glutamyl-tRNAGlu-forming). This enzyme participates in porphyrin and chlorophyll metabolism.

References

 
 
 

EC 1.2.1
NADPH-dependent enzymes
Enzymes of unknown structure